'Live and Well in Japan! is an album by saxophonist/composer Benny Carter recorded in 1977 and released by the Pablo label the following year.

Reception

AllMusic reviewer Scott Yanow stated "Benny Carter headed a talent-filled tentet for this frequently exciting concert. ... it is not at all surprising that the results would be memorable, but this date actually exceeds one's expectations".

Track listing
 "Squaty Roo" (Johnny Hodges) – 12:50
 "Tribute to Louis Armstrong: When It's Sleepy Time Down South/Confessin' That I Love You/When You're Smiling" (Clarence Muse, Leon René, Otis René/Doc Daugherty, Ellis Reynolds, Al J. Neiburg/Larry Shay, Mark Fisher, Joe Goodwin) – 6:05
 "Them There Eyes" (Maceo Pinkard, Doris Tauber, William Tracey) – 11:22
 "It Don't Mean a Thing (If It Ain't Got That Swing)" (Duke Ellington, Irving Mills) – 10:45

Personnel 
Benny Carter – alto saxophone, trumpet
Cat Anderson, Joe Newman – trumpet
Britt Woodman – trombone
Budd Johnson – tenor saxophone, soprano saxophone
Cecil Payne – baritone saxophone
Mundell Lowe – guitar
Nat Pierce – piano
George Duvivier – bass
Harold Jones – drums

References 

1978 live albums
Benny Carter live albums
Pablo Records live albums